A street suffix is the part of a street or road name that describes what type of road it is. Examples include "street", "avenue", "lane", "highway", and "drive".  As they are commonly repeated between roads, they are often abbreviated; for example, "St." instead of "Street". The way street suffixes are used varies around the world.

United Kingdom
In the United Kingdom, some councils maintain lists of locally approved suffixes for new roads.

Example
For example, Haringey Council in London provides this guidance:

However other suffixes may be used elsewhere in the UK (for example "Terrace" and "Green" are common), and it is by no means unusual for a street to be called by a name alone, without any suffix. It is also common for different streets in the same immediate area to have the same name but to be distinguished by different suffixes. It is also common for a street to have more than one suffix (e.g. "Park Gardens" or "Meadow Road". In Wales it is common to use Welsh-language suffixes (which actually usually precede the name) such as Ffordd, Heol, Stryd, Cae.

Some of the limitations used by Haringey are not relevant elsewhere, for example "lane" is often used for a minor rural road between fields, perhaps with no houses, and "way" is sometimes used for minor residential roads.

Allowed
 Road for any thoroughfare
 Street for any thoroughfare
 Way for major roads
 Avenue for residential roads, typically tree-lined
 Drive for residential roads
 Lane for residential roads
 Grove for residential roads, usually a cul-de-sac
 Gardens subject to there being no confusion with any local open space
 Place subject to there being no confusion with any local open space
 Circus for a Circus or for a large roundabout
 Crescent for a crescent-shaped road
 Bypass for a dual carriageway or motorway that bypasses a nearby village, city or town
 Close for a cul-de-sac only
 Square for a square only
 Hill for a hillside road only
 Mews provided it does not repeat the name of the road from which access is gained
 Vale for residential roads (only for exceptional circumstances)
 Rise/Row for residential roads (only for exceptional circumstances)
 Mead/Wharf for residential roads (only for exceptional circumstances)

Disallowed (but common in other parts of the UK)
 End
 Court
 Cross
 Side
 View
 Walk
 Park
 Meadow
 Green
 Quadrant
 Gate
 Gait
 Wynd

Regional variations
 Brow, in Cumbria
Brae, in Scotland

Mainland Europe
A few points of note on street suffixes in mainland Europe:

 In some languages the "street suffix" precedes the name and is thus a "street prefix" (rue Pasteur)
 In some languages the street suffix is not a separate word but is included in the same word as the rest of the name (Marktstrasse). This can sometimes be confusing to the uninitiated, especially if the main part of the name has more than one word, e.g. Frederik Hendriklaan 
 In some countries, occasionally a phrase is used instead of a suffix, e.g. Auf dem Hügel for Hill Street
 In some bilingual countries, multiple-language suffixes might appear at the same time in one street name phrase, to avoid repeating the main name, e.g. rue Van der Schrickstraat (instead of being double billed as rue Van der Schrick / Van der Schrickstraat)

United States
This list has examples of suffix forms that are primary street suffix names, common street suffixes or suffix abbreviations, recommended by the United States Postal Service. Commonly used street abbreviations are within parentheses.

Alley (Allee, Ally, or Aly)
Annex (Anex, Annx, or Anx)
Arcade (Arc)
Avenue (Av, Ave, Aven, Avenu, Avn, or Avnue)
Bayou (Bayoo or Byu)
Beach (Bch)
Bend (Bnd)
Bluff (Bluf or Blf)
Bluffs (Blfs)
Bottom (Bot, Bottm, or Btm)
Boulevard (Boul, Boulv, or Blvd)
Branch (Brnch or Br)
Bridge (Brdge or Brg)
Brook (Brk)
Brooks (Brks)
Burg (Bg)
Burgs (Bgs)
Bypass (Bypa, Bypas, Byps, or Byp)
Camp (Cmp or Cp)
Canyon (Canyn, Cnyn, or Cyn)
Cape (Cpe)
Causeway (Causwa or Cswy)
Center (Cen, Cent, Centr, Centre, Cnter, Cntr, or Ctr)
Centers (Ctrs)
Circle (Circ, Circl, Crcl, Crcle, or Cir)
Circles (Cirs)
Cliff (Clf)
Cliffs (Clfs)
Club (Clb)
Common (Cmn)
Commons (Cmns)
Corner (Cor)
Corners (Cors)
Course (Crse)
Court (Ct)
Courts (Cts)
Cove (Cv)
Coves (Cvs)
Creek (Crk)
Crescent (Crsent, Crsnt, or Cres)
Crest (Crst)
Crossing (Crssng or Xing)
Crossroad (Xrd)
Curve (Curv)
Dale (Dl)
Dam (Dm)
Divide (Div, Dvd, or Dv)
Drive (Driv, Drv, or Dr)
Drives (Drs)
Estate (Est)
Estates (Ests)
Expressway (Exp, Expr, Express, Expw, or Expy)
Extension (Extn, Extnsn, or Ext)
Extensions (Exts)
Fall
Falls (Fls)
Ferry (Frry or Fry)
Field (Fld)
Fields (Flds)
Flat (Flt)
Flats (Flts)
Ford (Frd)
Fords (Frds)
Forest (Frst)
Forge (Forg or Frg)
Forges (Frgs)
Fork (Frk)
Forks (Frks)
Fort (Frt or Ft)
Freeway (Freewy, Frway, Frwy, or Fwy)
Garden (Gardn, Grden, Grdn, or Gdn)
Gardens (Gdns)
Gateway (Gatewy, Gatway, Gtway, Gtwy)
Glen (Gln)
Glens (Glns)
Green (Grn)
Greens (Grns)
Grove (Grov or Grv)
Groves (Grvs)
Harbor (Harb, Harbr, Hrbor, or Hbr)
Harbors (Hbrs)
Haven (Hvn)
Heights (Hts)
Highway (Highwy, Hiway, Hiwy, Hway, or Hwy)
Hill (Hl)
Hills (Hls)
Hollow (Hllw, Holw, or Holws)
Inlet (Inlt)
Island (Is)
Islands (Iss)
Isle
Junction (Jction, Jctn, Junctn, Juncton, or Jct)
Junctions (Jcts)
Key (Ky)
Keys (Kys)
Knoll (Knol or Knl)
Knolls (Knls)
Lake (Lk)
Lakes (Lks)
Land
Landing (Lndng or Lndg)
Lane (Ln)
Light (Lgt)
Lights (Lgts)
Loaf (Lf)
Lock (Lck)
Locks (Lcks)
Lodge (Ldge, Lodg, or Ldg)
Loop (Lp)
Mall
Manor (Mnr)
Manors (Mnrs)
Meadow (Mdw)
Meadows (Medows or Mdws)
Mews
Mill (Ml)
Mills (Mls)
Mission (Msn)
Motorway (Mtwy)
Mount (Mt)
Mountain (Mtn)
Mountains (Mtns)
Neck (Nck)
Orchard (Orchrd or Orch)
Oval (Ovl)
Overpass (Opas)
Park (Prk)
Parks (Park)
Parkway (Parkwy, Pkway, Pky, or Pkwy)
Parkways (Pkwys)
Pass
Passage (Psge)
Path
Pike
Pine (Pne)
Pines (Pnes)
Place (Pl)
Plain (Pln)
Plains (Plns)
Plaza (Plza or Plz)
Point (Pt)
Points (Pts)
Port (Prt)
Ports (Prts)
Prairie (Prr or Pr)
Radial (Rad, Radiel, or Radl)
Ramp
Ranch (Rnch or Rnchs)
Rapid (Rpd)
Rapids (Rpds)
Rest (Rst)
Ridge (Rdge or Rdg)
Ridges (Rdgs)
River (Rvr, Rivr, or Riv)
Road (Rd)
Roads (Rds)
Route (Rte)
Row
Rue
Run
Shoal (Shl)
Shoals (Shls)
Shore (Shr)
Shores (Shrs)
Skyway (Skwy)
Spring (Spng, Sprng, or Spg)
Springs (Spgs)
Spur
Square (Sqr, Sqre, Squ, or Sq)
Squares (Sqs)
Station (Statn, Stn, or Sta)
Strasse (the German word for street, used in Summit Park, Utah and one road in Niederwald, Texas)
Stravenue (Strav, Straven, Stravn, Strvn, Strvnue, or Stra)
Stream (Streme or Strm)
Street (Str, Strt, or St)
Streets (Sts)
Summit (Sumit, Sumitt, or Smt)
Terrace (Terr or Ter)
Throughway (Trwy)
Trace (Trce)
Track (Trak, Trk, or Trks)
Trafficway (Trfy)
Trail (Trl)
Trailer (Trlr)
Tunnel (Tunl)
Turnpike (Trnpk, Turnpk, or Tpke)
Underpass (Upas)
Union (Un)
Unions (Uns)
Valley (Vally, Vlly, or Vly)
Valleys (Vlys)
Via
Viaduct (Vdct, Viadct, or Via)
View (Vw)
Views (Vws)
Village (Vill, Villag, Villg, or Vlg)
Villages (Vlgs)
Ville (Vl)
Vista (Vist, Vst, Vsta, or Vis)
Walk
Wall
Way (Wy)
Well (Wl)
Wells (Wls)

Australia
This list has examples of suffix forms suitable for use in Australia with clear connotations of the class and type of road, recommended by Standards Australia.  
 Alley (Ally)	Usually narrow roadway in cities or towns, often through city block or squares. 
 Approach (App)	Roadway leading to an area of community interest (e.g. public open space, commercial area, beach etc.)
 Arcade (Arc)	Passage having an arched roof, or any covered passageway, especially one with shops along the sides.
 Avenue (Av)	Broad roadway, usually planted on each side with trees.
 Boardwalk (Bwlk)	Promenade or path, especially of wooden planks, for pedestrians and sometimes vehicles, along or overlooking a beach or waterfront.
 Boulevard (Bvd)	Wide roadway, well paved, usually ornamented with trees and grass plots.
 Break (Brk)	Vehicular access on a formed or unformed surface, which was originally prepared as a firebreak.
 Bypass (Bypa)	Alternative roadway constructed to enable through traffic to avoid congested areas or other obstructions to movement.
 Chase (Ch)	Roadway leading down to a valley.
 Circuit (Cct)	Roadway enclosing an area.
 Close (Cl)	Short, enclosed roadway.
 Concourse (Con)	Roadway that runs around a central area (e.g. public open space or commercial area).
 Court (Ct)	Short, enclosed roadway.
 Crescent (Cr)	Crescent-shaped thoroughfare, especially where both ends join the same thoroughfare.
 Crest (Crst)	Roadway running along the top or summit of a hill.
 Drive (Dr)	Winding thoroughfare allowing a steady flow of traffic without many cross-streets.
 Entrance (Ent)	Roadway connecting other roads.
 Esplanade (Esp)	Level roadway, often along the seaside, lake or a river.
 Firetrail (Ftrl)	Vehicular access on a formed or unformed surface, which was originally prepared as a firebreak.
 Freeway (Fwy)	Express, multi-lane highway, with limited or controlled access.
 Glade (Glde)	Roadway usually in a valley of trees.
 Grange (Gra)	Roadway leading to a country estate, or focal point, public open space, shopping area etc.
 Grove (Gr)	Roadway that features a group of trees standing together.
 Highway (Hwy)	Main road or thoroughfare, a main route. Specifically reserved for roads associated with state arterial road networks, restricted to roads of strategic importance constructed to a high standard.   
 Lane 	Narrow way between walls, buildings or a narrow country or city roadway.
 Loop 	Roadway that diverges from and re-joins the main thoroughfare.
 Mall 	Sheltered walk, promenade or shopping precinct.
 Mews 	Roadway in a group of houses.
 Parade (Pde)	Public promenade or roadway that has good pedestrian facilities along the side.
 Parkway (Pwy)	Roadway through parklands or an open grassland area.
 Passage (Psge)	Narrow street for pedestrians.
 Path 	Roadway used only for pedestrian traffic.
 Place (Pl)	Short, sometimes narrow, enclosed roadway.
 Plaza (Plza)	Roadway enclosing the four sides of an area forming a market place or open space.
 Promenade (Prom)	Roadway like an avenue with plenty of facilities for the public to take a leisurely walk, a public place for walking.
 Quays (Qys)	Roadway leading to a landing place alongside or projecting into water.
 Ramp 	Access road to and from highways and freeways.
 Retreat (Rtt)	Roadway forming a place of seclusion.
 Ridge (Rdge)	Roadway along the top of a hill.
 Rise 	Roadway going to a higher place or position.
 Road (Rd)	Open way or public passage primarily for vehicles.
 Square (Sq)	Roadway bounding the four sides of an area to be used as an open space or a group of buildings.
 Steps (Stps)	Route consisting mainly of steps.
 Street (St)	Public roadway in a town, city or urban area, especially a paved thoroughfare with footpaths and buildings along one or both sides.
 Subway (Sbwy)	Underground passage or tunnel that pedestrians use for crossing under a road, railway, river etc.
 Terrace (Tce)	Roadway usually with houses on either side raised above the road level.
 Track (Trk)	Roadway with a single carriageway. A roadway through a natural bushland region. The interpretation for both Track and Trail is limited to roadways, whereas in many areas (e.g. Tasmania) these are often associated with walking rather than vehicular movement.
 Trail (Trl)	See ‘Track’.
 View 	Roadway commanding a wide panoramic view across surrounding areas.
 Vista (Vsta)	Roadway with a view or outlook.
 Walk 	Thoroughfare with restricted access used mainly by pedestrians.
 Way 	Roadway affording passage from one place to another. Usually not as straight as an avenue or street.
 Wharf (Whrf)	A roadway on a wharf or pier.

References

Streets